X-Men Red is an American comic book series published by Marvel Comics, featuring characters from X-Men stories.

The first series was an eleven-issue comic book series published by Marvel Comics in monthly installments between February and December 2018. It was written by Tom Taylor and illustrated by Mahmud A. Asrar. The book followed a new team of X-Men led by Jean Grey following her return in Phoenix Resurrection.

The second series featured the conflicting mutant factions on the Planet Arakko after the terraforming of Mars.

Publication history

Volume 1 
X-Men Red is part of the X-Men franchise and a sister book to X-Men Gold and X-Men Blue, which began ten months earlier. It follows events from the December 2017 miniseries Phoenix Resurrection: The Return of Jean Grey written by Matthew Rosenberg and illustrated by Leinil Francis Yu. The series was promoted as part of Marvel's Fresh Start, a full company relaunch of publications. The first issue, released February 7, 2018, was written by Tom Taylor and illustrated by Mahmud Asrar. It was available in ten different variant covers. Taylor's initial plans for the series did not involve any crossovers with other comic series.  

Jean Grey, a character recently resurrected after being dead for over a decade, assembles a new team with the intent to create a mutant nation. Her initial allies are Nightcrawler, Wolverine, Honey Badger, Gentle, Trinary, and Namor. They use Atlantis as their headquarters. After she attempts to convince the UN to recognize the mutant race as a nation with full human rights, Jean is framed for murder of an English congresswoman who is psychically murdered by a resurfaced Cassandra Nova, who uses this to alienate Jean in the public eye and label her a fugitive. Jean's team is thereby forced to act in secret as she continues in her goal to "heal the world".

An annual was published in May 2018 to detail the events between Phoenix Resurrection and X-Men Red #1.

Volume 2 
As part of the X-Men relaunch post-House of X, a second volume of the title written by Al Ewing was published under the banner Destiny of X and is a successor to Ewing's S.W.O.R.D. series.

Main characters

Team roster

Volume 1

Volume 2 
 Bold indicates current members as of 2022.

X-Men Red 
Formed by Abigail Brand to police and control matters on the planet Arakko.

Brotherhood of Arakko 
Formed by Storm as an opposition to X-Men Red, supported by Arakkii.

Great Ring of Arakko 

Governing body of Arakko, consisting of powerful players in planet Arakko.

Reception 
Prior to publication, the series generated interest for starring Grey, a character who was killed nearly 15 years earlier in New X-Men #150.

According to review aggregator Comic Book Roundup, the debut issue received an average score of 8.2 out of 10 based on 33 critical reviews. 

In a review for Newsarama, David Pepose praised the plot of the book for its focus on the coexistence of humans and mutants, which he said was the main premise of the X-Men franchise. IGN reviewer Jesse Shedeen agreed, saying the "franchise has a bad habit of ... losing sight of the mutant metaphor and its allegorical power", but was glad X-Men Red makes it a primary focus. 

Although they found Asrar's art to be flawed but adequate, both of them liked Taylor's portrayal of Grey and her supporting cast. Pepose specifically liked that Grey was a leader instead of a symbol, love interest, or target.

Prints

Collected editions

Volume 1

Volume 2

References

External links
 Official site

X-Men titles
2018 comics debuts